k.d. lang is a Canadian singer and songwriter. Her discography comprises 12 studio albums, one soundtrack, one live album, four compilation albums and 41 singles.

Albums

Studio albums

Collaborative albums

Live albums

Soundtrack albums

Compilation albums

Video albums

Singles

1980s

1990s

 "Constant Craving" did not reach its peak in the UK until 1993.

2000s and 2010s

Music videos

Contributions
Soundtracks
Shag - "Our Day Will Come" (w/ The Reclines, Take 6)
Dick Tracy - "Ridin' The Rails" (w/ Take 6)
Until the End of the World - "Calling All Angels" (w/ Jane Siberry)
Coneheads - "No More Tears" (w/ Andy Bell)
Twister - "Love Affair"
Home on the Range - "Little Patch of Heaven"
The Unplugged Collection, Volume One - "Barefoot"
Midnight in the Garden of Good and Evil - "Skylark"
Tomorrow Never Dies - "Surrender" (w/ David Arnold, Don Black)
Anywhere but Here - "Anywhere But Here"
Pee-wee’s Playhouse Christmas Special - "Jingle Bell Rock"
The Jim Henson Hour - "I Love Trash"
The MAX Sessions - "Helpless" (live)
Desperate Housewives - "Dream Of The Everyday Housewife"
The Black Dahlia (film, not on soundtrack) - "Love For Sale"
Happy Feet - "Golden Slumbers" / "The End"
Roy Orbison and Friends, A Black and White Night
Compilations
Northern Songs: Canada's Best and Brightest - "Constant Craving"
Grammy's Greatest Moments Volume II - "Constant Craving" (live version)
Being Out Rocks - "Summerfling"
Oh What a Feeling 3 - "Helpless"
Sounds Eclectic: The Covers Project - "Hallelujah"
Nashville: A New Country Tradition - "You Ain't Woman Enough To Take My Man" (w/Rosanne Cash)
Red Hot + Blue - "So In Love"
Tame Yourself - "Damned Old Dog"
Onda Sonora: Red Hot + Lisbon - "Fado Hilario"
Remembering Patsy Cline (2003) - "Leavin' On Your Mind"
Women: Live From The Mountain Stage (1996) - "Lock Stock And Teardrops" (live)
A Tribute to Joni Mitchell - "Help Me"
We All Love Ella: Celebrating the First Lady of Song - "Angel Eyes"
Collaborations
Mrs. Fun: They Are Not A Trio (1991) - "Lulu's Lament"
Dion: Yo Frankie (1989) - "Drive All Night"
Dwight Yoakam: Just Lookin' for a Hit - "Sin City"
Wendy & Lisa: Eroica - "Mother of Pearl"
Bob Telson: Calling You (1992) - "Barefoot"
Bruce Roberts: Intimacy - "Intimacy"
Elton John: Duets - "Teardrops"
The Killers: Imploding the Mirage - "Lightning Fields"
Carole King: Love Makes The World - "Uncommon Love"
Nellie McKay: Pretty Little Head - "We Had It Right"
Tony Bennett: MTV Unplugged: Tony Bennett - "Moonglow"
Tony Bennett: Playing with My Friends: Bennett Sings the Blues - "Keep the Faith, Baby"
Tony Bennett: Duets: An American Classic - "Because Of You"
Madeleine Peyroux: Half the Perfect World - "River"
Cornelius: CM2 (2003) - "Curiosity"
Ann Wilson: Hope & Glory - "Jackson"
1 Giant Leap: What About Me? - "Wounded in All the Right Places"
Anne Murray: Duets: Friends & Legends - "A Love Song"
Rosemary Clooney: 70: A Seventieth Birthday Celebration (1998) - "Our Love Is Here to Stay" w/ Linda Ronstadt

Notes

References

Discographies of Canadian artists
Pop music discographies
Country music discographies